Charlotte Caubel (born 2 June 1972 in Nancy, France) is a French politician who has been serving as State Secretary for Children in the government of Prime Minister Élisabeth Borne since 2022.

Career
From 2020 to 2022, Caubel led the activities on youth protection at the Ministry of Justice.

Personal life
Caubel is married to Alexandre Bompard and the mother of three daughters.

References

1972 births
Living people
Politicians from Nancy, France
Women government ministers of France
21st-century French women politicians
Secretaries of State of France
Members of the Borne government
Sciences Po alumni
Paris 2 Panthéon-Assas University alumni